Peter Robert Russell Wilson MBE (born 15 September 1986), is a retired English sport shooter who specialises in the double trap. He is the current world record holder for the event, having scored 198 out of 200 at a World Cup event in Arizona during 2012. A member of the British team for the 2012 Summer Olympics, he was the youngest competitor in the men's double trap event, where he won the gold medal.

Early life
Born in Dorset on 15 September 1986, Wilson took up shooting at his father's suggestion after he suffered nerve damage to his shoulder in a snowboarding accident which left him unable to play squash and cricket.

Education
Wilson was educated at three independent schools: at the pre-prep St. Antony's Leweston Preparatory School in the market town of Sherborne in Dorset, the junior school Hazlegrove Preparatory School in the village of Sparkford, near the town of Yeovil in Somerset, followed by senior school at Millfield School in the town of Street, also in Somerset. He then went to Arts University Bournemouth (formerly Arts Institute at Bournemouth), in the large coastal town of Poole in Dorset, where he studied Graphic Design.

Career
Wilson tried his hand at both skeet and trap but was not enthusiastic enough to train religiously for them. However, after trying double trap he found a discipline that he is happy to train for every day. Wilson was encouraged by Ian Coley after meeting at the Bisley shooting ground. Soon after this he was training with shooters such as Richard Faulds and Stevan Walton.

Within four months of trying shooting at the Bisley Ranges, Wilson became the 2006 European Junior Champion at the tournament in Slovenia.

In 2008 he attended the 2008 Summer Olympics as part of Great Britain's Olympic Ambition Programme to expose possible future Olympians to the Olympic experience. He began being coached by Ahmad Mohammad Hasher Al Maktoum, who is a member of the ruling family of Dubai and the 2004 Summer Olympics gold medallist in the double trap. Following budget cuts by UK Sport following the lack of shooting medals at the 2008 Summer Olympics, Wilson's funding was removed completely and he was required to fund his shooting expenses which amount to nearly £10,000 a year.

Wilson finished in fourth place at the 2011 European Shooting Championships in Belgrade with a score of 191 in the final. However, the British team came second overall, earning Wilson a silver medal alongside Stevan Walton and Richard Faulds. At a World Cup event held in Tucson, Arizona in 2012, Wilson set a new world record for the double trap. He scored 198 out of a possible 200 in the final, beating the previous record of 196. By winning a silver at the World Cup event in Chile in March 2012, he gained another quota spot for the British team for the 2012 Summer Olympics.

He is a member of the Southern Counties shooting club. Having warmed up at the Royal Artillery Barracks in Woolwich in April in the test event for the Olympic venue, on 28 May, Wilson was named part of the British team at the 2012 Summer Olympics. He won gold, scoring 188 out of a possible 200 hits on 2 August 2012. It was Britain's first Olympic shooting medal since teammate Richard Faulds won the event in the 2000 Sydney Olympics.

Wilson was appointed Member of the Order of the British Empire (MBE) in the 2013 New Year Honours for services to shooting.

On 31 October 2014, at the age of 28, Wilson officially announced his retirement from competitive shooting to focus on personal life and coaching, ending abruptly his short, but remarkable career with an Olympic gold medal in men's double trap from London 2012, and three more from the 2013 ISSF World Cup series.

See also
 2012 Olympics gold post boxes in the United Kingdom

References

External links

Living people
1986 births
English male sport shooters
English Olympic medallists
People educated at Millfield
Sportspeople from Dorset
Trap and double trap shooters
Olympic gold medallists for Great Britain
Shooters at the 2012 Summer Olympics
Olympic medalists in shooting
Olympic shooters of Great Britain
Members of the Order of the British Empire
Alumni of Arts University Bournemouth
Medalists at the 2012 Summer Olympics